CDBA can mean:
Clearance Diver's Breathing Apparatus, types of naval diver's rebreather:
Siebe Gorman CDBA
Carleton CDBA

common data bus architecture' in computers.
'Current differencing buffered amplifier in electronics.
Centro de Big Data e Analytics - an analytics team.

Dragon boat associations
California Dragon Boat Association - the Governing Body for Dragon Boat Racing in California.
Chinese Dragon Boat Association - the National Governing Body for Dragon Boat Racing in China.
Canberra Dragon Boat Association - the dragon boat body for the Australian Capital Territory.

Rebreathers